In materials chemistry, a quaternary phase is a chemical compound containing four elements. Some compounds can be molecular or ionic, examples being chlorodifluoromethane sodium bicarbonate. More typically quaternary phase refers to extended solids.  A famous example are the yttrium barium copper oxide superconductors.

See also
Binary compound
Ternary compound

References

Chemical compounds